Ľuboš Chmelík (1 May 1989) is a Slovak footballer who plays as a central defender.

External links
Official site 

1989 births
Living people
Slovak footballers
Slovakia youth international footballers
Association football central defenders
FK Dubnica players
FK Dukla Banská Bystrica players
Slovak Super Liga players
People from Ilava
Sportspeople from the Trenčín Region